Speak Your Mind is the debut studio album by English singer Anne-Marie, released on 27 April 2018 by Major Tom's and Asylum Records. Anne-Marie announced the album on 21 February 2018 and it was made available for pre-order two days later. The album was preceded by the release of seven singles and features collaborations with Marshmello, Clean Bandit, David Guetta and Sean Paul.

The album received generally favourable reviews and was a commercial success, peaking at number 3 in both the UK Albums (OCC) chart and the Scottish Albums (OCC) chart. It also peaked at number 4 in the Irish Albums (IRMA) chart. It has since been certified platinum in both United Kingdom (BPI) and the United States (RIAA).

Background
Talking to Polish pop culture magazine Luvpop about the album's title, Anne-Marie said: "I just feel like that's what I did on the album. I'm not a shy person anyway, I speak my mind a lot and I am not... I don't hold anything in, I am honest with people and open. And I've just feel that's what I've been like on this album, so it kinda makes sense."

Singles
"Alarm" was released as the lead single from Speak Your Mind on 20 May 2016. The single became Anne-Marie's first major worldwide hit, peaking at No. 16 on the UK Singles Chart. The single additionally reached the top 20 in as Australia and Scotland, as well as the top 40 in seven countries. It was certified Platinum in the UK, Australia, and Poland, and Gold in the US and Canada. The music video for the song, also released on 20 May 2016, was directed by Malia James and filmed in Mexico City. It is loosely inspired by Baz Luhrmann's 1996 film Romeo + Juliet.

"Ciao Adios" was released as the second official single on 10 February 2017. The single became her first top ten hit in the UK, reaching No. 9, while also reaching the top ten in Belgium, Netherlands, Poland, and Scotland. The single had moderate success elsewhere. The "Ciao Adios" music video was released on 9 March 2017 on YouTube and features Anne-Marie with her girl gang dancing in Marrakech, Morocco with plenty of colors.

"Heavy" was released on 22 September 2017 as the third single from the record. It failed to replicate the success of "Alarm" and "Ciao Adios", reaching the top 40 in the UK, and only charting in a couple other territories. The music video for "Heavy" was released on 16 October 2017. "Then" was released on 15 December 2017 as the fourth single. The single reached No. 87 in the UK charts.

"Friends", a collaboration with American DJ Marshmello, was released as the fifth single on 9 February 2018. It reached the top ten in the UK, Ireland, and Hungary, as well as the top forty in twelve countries. The song additionally became Anne-Marie's first US Billboard Hot 100 entry as a lead artist, where it peaked at no. 11. The music video, directed by Hannah Lux Davis, was released on 16 February 2018. In the visual, Anne-Marie and a group of female friends host a house party. Marshmello keeps avoiding being asked to leave. However, as Anne-Marie attempts to kick him out, he keeps finding ways to get back into the house, which annoys Anne-Marie and her friends.

"2002" was released as the sixth single on 20 April 2018. The song debuted at number 8 in the United Kingdom, becoming Anne-Marie's fourth UK top 10 hit, before later climbing to number three, making it Anne-Marie's highest-charting song as a lead artist. It also reached the top ten in Ireland, Scotland, and Australia. A remixed version of "Perfect" retitled "Perfect to Me" was released as a single on 2 November 2018. It has reached number 57 in the United Kingdom.

Promotional single
On 21 October 2016, a stripped version of "Peak" was released. It later became the main version of the song, and was included on Speak Your Mind as the first promotional single.

Critical reception

At Metacritic, which assigns a normalised rating out of 100 to reviews from mainstream critics, Speak Your Mind has an average score of 62 based on eight reviews, indicating "generally favorable reviews".

Track listing 

Notes
  originally appears on her debut EP Karate
  signifies an additional producer
 "2002" contains elements of:
 "Oops!... I Did It Again" written by Max Martin and Rami Yacoub.
 "99 Problems" written by Tracy Marrow, Alphonso Henderson and George Clinton Jr.
 "Bye Bye Bye" written by Andreas Carlsson, Jacob Schulze and Kristian Lundin
 "Ride wit Me" written by William DeBarge, Eldra DeBarge, Etterlene Jordan, Jason Epperson, Lavell Webb and Cornell Haynes
 "...Baby One More Time" written by Max Martin

Personnel
Credits for Speak Your Mind adapted from AllMusic.

Studios
Recording locations

 Pineapple Box (Los Angeles)  recording 
 Rustic Road  vocals recording, guitar, bass, keyboards, synth & drum programming 
 Miloco's 'The Pool' (London)  vocals recording 
 Sarm Studios (London)  vocals recording 
 Rokstone Studios (London)  recording 
 The Garden (London)  recording 
 SARM Music Village (London)  recording 
 Strongroom Studios (London)  recording 
 Atlantic Records (Los Angeles)  recording 
 Grove Studios (London)  recording 
 NPAP Sounds (London)  recording 
 Straight Forward Music (London)  recording 
 Major Tom's (London)  recording 
 The Music Shed (London)  recording 
 Inspiration Way (Tujunga, CA)  recording 
 Hazelville Road Studios  recording 
 88 Hazelville Road (London)  recording 

Mixing and mastering locations
 
 The Nest (UK)  mixing 
 Callanwolde Fine Arts Center (Atlanta, GA  mixing  
 The Mixsuite UK & LA  mixing 
 Metropolis Mastering (London)  mastering

Performers and Vocals

 Anne-Marie – primary artist, vocals 
 Jennifer Decilveo – background vocals , synthesizer , drum programming , keyboards 
 Tom Meredith – guitar, bass, keyboards, synth and drum programming 
 MdL – guitar, bass, keyboards, synth and drum programming 
 Chris Laws – drums 
 Amir Amor – drums 
 Steve Mac – keyboards 
 Paul Gendler – guitars 
 Thomas Foley – additional drum programming and keyboards 
 Shane Tremlin – additional drum programming and keyboards 
 Emily Warren – background vocals 
 Daniel 'D Rock' Hutchinson – electric guitar 
 Chris Loco – keyboards, percussion 
 John Paricelli – guitar 
 Levi Lennox – keyboard 
 Geo – cello 
 Nick Monson – keyboards 
 Mark Nilan – keyboards 
 Jason Pebworth – keyboards 
 Jon Shave – keyboards 
 Nana Rogues – keyboards, bass 
 Jonathan White – keyboards, guitar, bass 
 MNEK – keyboards 
 Team Salut – guitar 
 Ed Sheeran – guitar 
 Tom Barnes – drums 
 Pete Kelleher – keyboard 
 Ben Kohn – bass and guitar 
 Teddy Geiger – keys 
 Zach Nicita – keys 
 Ilsey Juber – guitars 
 Brad Ellis – piano,  percussion, bass , strings , synths

Production

 Jennifer Decilveo – production 
 Tom Meredith – production, vocal production 
 MdL – production 
 Steve Mac – production 
 Amir Amor – additional production 
 Chris Loco – production 
 Moon Willis – additional production 
 Levi Lennox – production 
 Marshmello – production 
 Nick Monson – production 
 The Invisible Men – production 
 Nana Rogues – production 
 Jonathan White – production 
 MNEK – additional production 
 Team Salut – additional production 
 Cameron Gower Poole – additional vocal production 
 TMS – production 
 Sam Klempner – additional production 
 Teddy Geiger – production 
 Zach Nicita – production 
 Brad Ellis – production

Technical

 Stuart Hawkes – mastering 
 Geoff Swan – mixing 
 Jennifer Decilveo – engineering, programming 
 Phil Tan – mixing 
 Bill Zimmerman – assistant engineering 
 Tom Meredith – vocal recording 
 Cameron Gower Poole – additional vocal recording , engineering 
 Dann Pursey – engineering 
 Chris Laws – engineering , programming 
 Chris Loco – programming and recording 
 Mark "Spike" Stent – mixing 
 Micheal Freemen – engineering assistance 
 Marshmello – programming 
 Benjamin Rice – engineering 
 Nick Monson – programming 
 Mark Nilan – programming 
 MNEK – vocal recording and programming 
 Jon Shave – programming 
 George Astasio – programming 
 Dylan Cooper – programming 
 Nana Rogues – programming
 Jonathan White – programming 
 Fabian Lenssen – mixing 
 Chris Bishop – additional vocal engineering 
 Tom Barnes – programming 
 Sam Klempner – programming 
 Teddy Geiger – engineering and programming 
 Zach Nicita – programming 
 Brad Ellis – mixing  and programming 
 Lexxx – mixing 
 David Emery – mixing

Artwork

 Michael Furlong – photography
 Sam Nicholson – doodle artwork
 Baby – design

Charts

Weekly charts

Year-end charts

Certifications

References 

2018 debut albums
Albums produced by Chris Loco
Albums produced by MNEK
Albums produced by Steve Mac
Asylum Records albums
Anne-Marie (singer) albums
Albums produced by Nick Monson
Albums produced by TMS (production team)
Major Tom's albums
Albums produced by Jennifer Decilveo